Aaron Stanton Merrill (March 26, 1890 – February 28, 1961), also known as Tip Merrill, was an American rear admiral during World War II who led American naval forces during the Solomon Islands campaign as well as the first admiral to solely use radar for fire control during wartime.

Military career

1912–1939
After graduating from the United States Naval Academy in 1912, Merrill first served for several years in the Mediterranean Sea. He was assigned to the destroyer , based in Plymouth, England, during the last months of World War I. In 1919 he commanded the patrol craft , based at Harwich, England.

Merrill returned to the Mediterranean in late 1919 with the rank of lieutenant commander, to serve on the staff of Rear Admiral Mark Lambert Bristol, the United States High Commissioner to Turkey and Commander of United States Naval Forces in the Eastern Mediterranean. In 1925 he commanded the gunboat  on the Yangtze Patrol.

After two years at the Office of Naval Intelligence in Washington, D.C., in June 1929 he was given command of the destroyer . After three years at sea he was promoted to commander, and spent another year in the Office of Naval Intelligence, and then served as Aide to the Assistant Secretary of the Navy, Henry L. Roosevelt.

In June 1935 Merrill was assigned to the heavy cruiser , and received the  Order of the Crown from the Belgian Government, after  conveying the remains of Paul May, the Belgian Ambassador to the United States, back to Antwerp.

He served for a year as naval attaché at the American Embassy at Santiago, Chile from May 1937. During his period he cruised extensively with the Chilean Navy, becoming the first foreigner to round the Horn in a Chilean warship. For his services he was awarded the Chilean Order of Merit. 

In 1938–39 Merrill completed the senior course at the Naval War College, Newport, Rhode Island, and was promoted to captain.

World War II
Merrill was Professor of Naval Science and Tactics at Tulane University, until being assigned command of the battleship  in April 1942. After promotion to rear admiral in January 1943, Merrill would lead a cruiser-destroyer task force participating in the Battle of Guadalcanal and would later win distinction during the Bougainville campaign at the Battle of Empress Augusta Bay successfully defending ground forces against an assault by the Japanese fleet in a hard-fought night battle. 

In March 1943, during the Solomon Island campaign, he would show the usefulness of radar against enemy naval forces at the Battle of Blackett Strait. For his efforts he received both the Legion of Merit and the Navy Cross.

Serving as Director of Office of Public Relations for the Navy Department from June 15, 1944, until April 23, 1945, Merrill would join a diplomatic delegation to meet with members of the Chilean government to discuss mutual defense policies in Santiago, Chile. While in attendance, Merrill's efforts to establish an American naval mission to Chile in place of the former British presence would earn him the title of Grand Officer of the Order of Merit by Chile.

Post-war 
In June 1946, after briefly serving for several months as commandant of the Eighth Naval District in New Orleans, Louisiana, Merrill assumed command of Gulf Sea Frontier, remaining in this post until being placed on the retired list in November 1947, eventually retiring a vice admiral. Moving first to Natchez, Mississippi and later to New Orleans following his retirement, Merrill would live with his wife until his death on February 28, 1961.

Personal life
Admiral Merrill was born March 26, 1890, at Brandon Hall in Adams County, Mississippi, to parents Dunbar Surget Merrill and Charlotte Brandon Stanton. His 2nd great-grandfather was Gerard Chittocque Brandon, one of Mississippi's earliest governors. His grandfather, Ayres Phillips Merrill, was also once U.S. Minister to Belgium.

He inherited the nickname "Tip" from his great-grandfather, who garnered the moniker after fighting in the Battle of Tippecanoe. His father, Aaron Stanton, a Confederate soldier, was also known as "Tip".

Merrill married New York native, Louise Gautier Witherbee, on January 28, 1922; they remained together until his death in 1961.

Awards
Navy Cross
Legion of Merit
Mexican Service Medal
World War I Victory Medal with star
Yangtze Service Medal
American Defense Service Medal with "FLEET" clasp
American Campaign Medal
Asiatic-Pacific Campaign Medal with four battle stars
World War II Victory Medal
Commander, Order of the Crown (Belgium)
Grand Officer, Order of Merit (Chile)

See also

References
 Parrish, Thomas and S. L. A. Marshall, ed. The Simon and Schuster Encyclopedia of World War II, New York: Simon and Schuster, 1978.
 James J. Fahey, Pacific War Diary: 1942 - 1945, The Secret Diary of an American Sailor, New York: Houghton Mifflin, 1991. 
Diaries, in general, were against Navy regulations, and so Fahey offers a rare view of not just life on the Montpelier, but of wartime naval life in general. To this seaman the Admiral was a remote but favorable figure.

External links
Aaron Stanton Merrill (Archived 2009-10-24)

1890 births
1961 deaths
United States Navy World War II admirals
People from Natchez, Mississippi
People from New Orleans
United States Naval Academy alumni
United States Navy admirals
Recipients of the Navy Cross (United States)
Recipients of the Legion of Merit
People from Washington, Mississippi
Military personnel from Mississippi
Military personnel from Louisiana